William Malone may refer to:

Bill C. Malone (born 1934), American musician and writer
Bill Malone (magician) (born 1958), American entertainer
Bill Malone (broadcaster), American television and radio personality
William George Malone (1859–1915), World War I New Zealand officer
William M. Malone (1900–1981), politician in San Francisco, California
William Malone (baseball) (1868–1917), American baseball player
William Malone (director) (born 1953), American filmmaker

See also
Billy Malone, a character in the TV series Arrow